Bhapa or (Bhaapa) is a term used in Punjab by the members of the Sikh community in a pejorative sense for Sikhs that migrated from Pakistan after the Partition of India in 1947.

Bhapa describes Sikhs who migrated to India, especially from the Rawalpindi area, also known as the Khukhrain's area, and its neighbouring regions. The Bhapa name at first was only associated with migrated Sikh traders/shopkeepers.

Bhapa is a term used in the Potohari dialect used in Rawalpindi area. It was a common term for the elder brother or father and is still often used in that sense. It is somewhat equivalent of sir. Derived from Sanskrit Bappa or Vapra, it is cognate to Bawa. The term has occasionally been used as a royal title in some regions of India. The best-known king with the title was Bappa Rawal, the founder of the Guhilot dynasty.

References

Ethnic and religious slurs
Sikh communities